Christa Lehmann { Ambros ; born 1922) is a German serial killer.

Murders 
Lehmann was born in Worms in 1922. She married Karl Franz Lehmann in 1944. Karl Franz died unexpectedly on 27 September 1952 within a half hour of violent convulsions. The doctor determined the cause of death as peptic ulcer disease. On 14 October 1953, her father-in-law, Valentin Lehmann, fell clinically dead from his bicycle during a trip to the city. The doctor summoned by passers-by diagnosed the death as heart failure.

Christa made friends with Annie Hamann, a war widow who lived in a common household with her mother Eva Ruh, her brother Walter and her 9-year-old daughter. On Sunday 14 February 1954 Lehmann came to visit and brought five chocolate mushrooms with liquor filling. She shared four of the chocolates with Hamann, her brother, a neighbour who happened to be around, and offered the fifth one to Ruh. She politely declined and put it aside.

The next day Annie came home, found the praline in the kitchen cupboard, bit into it, swallowed a part and spat the other half out disgusted on the floor. The family dog ate the rest of the praline. A short time later, Annie paled, stumbled and said she could no longer see anything. She staggered into the bedroom, accompanied by her mother, and lay plagued on the bed. She lost consciousness and Ruh sought help. When the doctor called by the neighbours arrived, Annie was already dead, as was the dog in the kitchen. After describing the events, the doctor informed the police.

Conviction 
Annie's body was brought to the forensic institute in Mainz. After long investigations (inter alia on strychnine), Professor Kurt Wagner tested Annie's stomach contents on the plant protection product E 605, a poison that had been invented in Germany but at that time primarily used in the United States. The poisoning effect was very similar to that of hydrogen cyanide. By that time, however, there had been no proven case of murder or suicide using E 605. The 168 cases of poisoning documented in the United States until 1953 were due to gross negligence and were rather mild, with the exception of nine cases. Therefore, there was not method to prove E 605 forensically.

Christa was arrested and interrogated. On 23 February she made a confession. It was not meant for Annie, but for her mother. On 19 March the bodies of Karl Franz and Valentin were exhumed. Both showed signs of E 605. On 20 September 1954 Christa's trial began. She was sentenced to life imprisonment. In 1971 she was transferred to the women's prison in Frankfurt. After 23 years of prison, she was released and lived freely under a new identity.

See also
 List of German serial killers

Literature 
 Jürgen Thorwald: The century of detectives. Path and adventure of criminalistics. Volume 3: Handbook for poisoners. Droemer Knaur, Munich u. a. 1968, (Several Editions).
 Stephan Harbort: The serial killer principle. What forces people to evil? Droste publishing house, Düsseldorf 2006, .
 Ernst Klee: Christa Lehmann. The confession of the poisoner. Krüger, Frankfurt am Main 1977, .

External links 
 [Deutschlandradio – ein Interview zum Thema Giftmord Deutschlandradio - an interview on poisoning]
 
 Article by Ernst Klee on Christa Lehmann: The story of the poison killer in the weekly Die Zeit

1922 births
Possibly living people
German female serial killers
Mariticides
People from Worms, Germany
Poisoners